Nicklas Johansson (born June 12, 1984) is a Swedish professional ice hockey player. He is currently playing with IF Björklöven in the Swedish Allsvenskan.

On June 5, 2013, Johansson signed a two-year contract extension with IF Björklöven.

References

External links

1984 births
Living people
IF Björklöven players
Swedish ice hockey forwards
Sportspeople from Umeå